Beesel is a municipality and a town in the province of Limburg in the southeastern Netherlands.

Population centres 
Beesel
Offenbeek
Reuver

Topography

Topographic map of the municipality of Beesel, June 2015.

The town of Beesel 
The town of Beesel lies about 10 km north of Roermond. Although the municipality is named after this village, it is not the largest town in the municipality, and neither is the municipal hall located in Beesel.

In 2001, Beesel had 7382
inhabitants. The built-up area of the town was 0.53 km², and contained 706 residences.

Transportation 
 Reuver railway station

Notable people 
 Mark Jansen (born 1978 in Reuver) a Dutch guitarist, vocalist and songwriter, worked with the symphonic metal band After Forever
 Sander Gommans (born 1978 in Reuver) a Dutch musician with symphonic metal band After Forever

Gallery

References

External links 

Official website

 
Municipalities of Limburg (Netherlands)
Populated places in Limburg (Netherlands)